James Danly is an American attorney serving as a member of the Federal Energy Regulatory Commission. He was nominated by President Donald Trump in 2019 and took office on March 31, 2020. He formerly served as the agency's general counsel. On November 5, 2020, he was named chairman of FERC. After serving for only 77 days, Danly was demoted on January 21, 2021, when President Biden named Richard Glick Chairman.

Background 
Danly is a native of Nashville, Tennessee. He earned a Bachelor of Arts degree in English from Yale University and Juris Doctor from the Vanderbilt University Law School. After graduating from law school, Danly worked as an attorney in the energy industry, including at the law firm Skadden.

References

Living people
Year of birth missing (living people)
Trump administration personnel
Vanderbilt University Law School alumni
Yale College alumni
People from Nashville, Tennessee
Skadden, Arps, Slate, Meagher & Flom people
Tennessee Republicans
Federal Energy Regulatory Commission chairpersons